Seeland District in the Canton of Bern was created on 1 January 2010. It is part of the Seeland administrative region.

Municipalities

Mergers and name changes
On 1 January 2011 the municipality of Busswil bei Büren merged into the municipality of Lyss.

On 1 January 2013 the municipality of Niederried bei Kallnach merged into Kallnach. The municipality of Ruppoldsried merged into Rapperswil.

On 1 January 2016 the municipality of Bangerten merged into Rapperswil.

On 1 January 2019 the former municipality of Golaten merged into Kallnach.

History
During the Ancien Régime Bern acquired the rural bailiwicks or counties of Aarberg, Buren, Erlach and Nidau from the estates of the Lords of Aarberg-Valangin, Strassberg-Büren, Nidau and the Counts of Neuchâtel. Between 1595 and 1628 they were combined militarily into the so-called Seefähnchen. However, they were politically separate. It was not until 1783-84 that Johann Friedrich von Ryhiner's administrative compendium of the Bernese State presented the four counties as a united region.

During the Helvetic Republic (1798-1803), the borders of the Seeland shrunk to the Amt of Erlach and portions of the Amts of Nidau and Aarberg. Between 1803 and 1815 it was a Grand Council of Bern election district with the Amts of Fraubrunnen and Wangen and portions of the Amts of Bern and Burgdorf. Between 1850 and 1918 it formed a National Council of Switzerland constituency, made up of Laupen and Biel. From 1869 to 1921 it was again a Grand Council of Bern election district made up of the Amts of Biel, Aarberg, Laupen and the northern portion of Bern. In 2010, the Seeland region was created with the Districts of Biel and Seeland. The new Seeland district (Verwaltungskreise) was made up of all or part of the former districts of Aarberg, Büren, Erlach and Nidau

The Bernese Seeland consists of two differing landscapes. The lake shore areas were occupied as far back as the Neolithic, such as the UNESCO World Heritage Site pile dwellings at Twann from about 3800 BC. The lake shore areas were easily settled and fishing dominated the local economies. During the Middle Ages vineyards were added on the slopes of the Jura Mountains above the lakes. In contrast, the plains and the Grosses Moos swamp were crossed by meandering rivers like the Aare and Zihl/Thielle which frequently flooded making the land hostile to settlements. The villages on the edges of the swamp, used the swamp mainly for grazing. However, following the Jura water correction projects the bogs were drained and the formerly useless swamps became excellent farming land.

Demographics

, the population was 49.4% male and 50.6% female. The population was made up of 30,045 Swiss men (44.0% of the population) and 3,719 (5.4%) non-Swiss men. There were 31,406 Swiss women (46.0%) and 311 (0.5%) non-Swiss women.

References

Districts of the canton of Bern